The 2013–14 Winthrop Eagles men's basketball team represented Winthrop University during the 2013–14 NCAA Division I men's basketball season. The Eagles, led by second year head coach Pat Kelsey, played their home games at the Winthrop Coliseum and were members of the South Division of the Big South Conference. They finished the season 20–13, 10–6 in Big South play to finish in a three way tie for second place in the South Division. They advanced to the championship game of the Big South Conference tournament where they lost to Coastal Carolina. Despite having 20 wins, they did not participate in a postseason tournament.

Roster

Schedule

|-
!colspan=9 style="background:#8C2633; color:#FFD700;"| Regular season

|-
!colspan=9 style="background:#8C2633; color:#FFD700;"| Big South tournament

* The January 4 game vs. Barber-Scotia was postponed after bad weather in the Northeast kept five Barber-Scotia player from returning to school after the Christmas break. With two other player injured, they were not going to have enough players for the game.

References

Winthrop Eagles men's basketball seasons
Winthrop
Winthrop Eagles
Winthrop Eagles